The 1978 UEFA European Under-21 Championship, which spanned two years (1976–78) had 24 entrants. Yugoslavia U-21s won the competition.

The 24 national teams were divided into eight groups. The group winners played off against each other on a two-legged home-and-away basis until the winner was decided.  There was no finals tournament or 3rd-place playoff.

Qualifying stage

Draw
The allocation of teams into qualifying groups was based on that of 1978 FIFA World Cup qualification with several changes, reflecting the absence of some nations:
 Group 1 did not include Portugal (moved to Group 2) and Cyprus, but included Sweden (moved from Group 6)
 Group 2 did not include England and Finland (both moved to Group 5), but included Portugal (moved from Group 1)
 Group 3 did not include Malta
 Group 4 did not include Netherlands, Northern Ireland and Iceland, but included France and Bulgaria (both moved from Group 5)
 Group 5 composed of England and Finland (both moved from Group 2) and Norway (moved from Group 6)
 Group 6 (based on World Cup qualifying Group 7) did not include Wales, but included Switzerland (moved from World Cup Group 6)
 Groups 7 and 8 included the same teams as World Cup qualifying Groups 8 and 9 respectively

Group 1

Group 2

Group 3

Group 4

Group 5

Group 6

Group 7

Group 8

Qualified teams

Squads
See 1978 UEFA European Under-21 Championship squads

Knockout stage

References

External links
 RSSSF Results Archive ''at rsssf.com

UEFA European Under-21 Championship
UEFA
UEFA
1978 in youth association football